Beta thalassemias (β thalassemias) are a group of inherited blood disorders. They are forms of thalassemia caused by reduced or absent synthesis of the beta chains of hemoglobin that result in variable outcomes ranging from severe anemia to clinically asymptomatic individuals. Global annual incidence is estimated at one in 100,000. Beta thalassemias occur due to malfunctions in the hemoglobin subunit beta or HBB. The severity of the disease depends on the nature of the mutation.

HBB blockage over time leads to decreased beta-chain synthesis. The body's inability to construct new beta-chains leads to the underproduction of HbA (adult hemoglobin). Reductions in HbA available overall to fill the red blood cells in turn leads to microcytic anemia. Microcytic anemia ultimately develops in respect to inadequate HBB protein for sufficient red blood cell functioning. Due to this factor, the patient may require blood transfusions to make up for the blockage in the beta-chains. 
Repeated blood transfusions cause severe problems associated with iron overload.

Signs and symptoms 

Three main forms have been described: thalassemia minor, thalassemia intermedia, and thalassemia major which vary from asymptomatic or mild symptoms to severe anemia requiring lifelong transfusions. Individuals with beta thalassemia major (those who are homozygous for thalassemia mutations, or inheriting 2 mutations) usually present within the first two years of life with symptomatic severe anemia, poor growth, and skeletal abnormalities. Untreated thalassemia major eventually leads to death, usually by heart failure; therefore, prenatal screening is very important. Those with beta thalassemia intermedia (those who are compound heterozygotes for the beta thalassemia mutation) usually present later in life with mild to moderate symptoms of anemia. Beta thalassemia trait (also known as beta thalassemia minor) involves heterozygous inheritance of a beta-thalassemia mutation and patients usually have borderline microcytic, hypochromic anemia and they are usually asymptomatic or have mild symptoms. Beta thalassemia minor can also present as beta thalassemia silent carriers; those who inherit a beta thalassemic mutation but have no hematologic abnormalities nor symptoms. Some people with thalassemia are susceptible to health complications that involve the spleen (hypersplenism) and gallstones (due to hyperbilirubinemia from peripheral hemolysis). These complications are mostly found in thalassemia major and intermedia patients.

Excess iron (from hemolysis or transfusions) causes serious complications within the liver, heart, and endocrine glands. Severe symptoms include liver cirrhosis, liver fibrosis, and in extreme cases, liver cancer. Heart failure, growth impairment, diabetes and osteoporosis are life-threatening conditions which can be caused by beta thalassemia major. The main cardiac abnormalities seen as a result of beta thalassemia and iron overload include left ventricular systolic and diastolic dysfunction, pulmonary hypertension, valvulopathy, arrhythmias, and pericarditis. Increased gastrointestinal iron absorption is seen in all grades of beta thalassemia, and increased red blood cell destruction by the spleen due to ineffective erythropoiesis further releases additional iron into the bloodstream.

Additional symptoms of beta thalassemia major or intermedia include the classic symptoms of moderate to severe anemia including fatigue, growth and developmental delay in childhood, leg ulcers and organ failure. Ineffective erythropoiesis (red blood cell production) can also lead to compensatory bone marrow expansion which can then lead to bony changes/deformities, bone pain and craniofacial abnormalities. Extramedullary organs such as the liver and spleen that can also undergo erythropoiesis become activated leading to hepatosplenomegaly (enlargement of the liver and spleen). Other tissues in the body can also become sites of erythropoiesis, leading to extramedullary hematopoietic pseudotumors which may cause compressive symptoms if they occur in the thoracic cavity or spinal canal.

Cause

Mutations 
Two major groups of mutations can be distinguished:
 Nondeletion forms: These defects, in general, involve a single base substitution or small insertions near or upstream of the β globin gene. Most often, mutations occur in the promoter regions preceding the beta-globin genes. Less often, abnormal splice variants are believed to contribute to the disease.
 Deletion forms: Deletions of different sizes involving the β globin gene produce different syndromes such as (βo) or hereditary persistence of fetal hemoglobin syndromes.
Mutations are characterized as (βo) if they prevent any formation of β globin chains, mutations are characterized as (β+) if they allow some β globin chain formation to occur.

mRNA assembly 

Beta thalassemia is a hereditary disease affecting hemoglobin. As with about half of all hereditary diseases, an inherited mutation damages the assembly of the messenger-type RNA (mRNA) that is transcribed from a chromosome. DNA contains both the instructions (genes) for stringing amino acids together into proteins, as well as stretches of DNA that play important roles in regulating produced protein levels.

In thalassemia, an additional, contiguous length or a discontinuous fragment of non-coding instructions is included in the mRNA. This happens because the mutation obliterates the boundary between the intronic and exonic portions of the DNA template. Because all the coding sections may still be present, normal hemoglobin may be produced and the added genetic material, if it produces pathology, instead disrupts regulatory functions enough to produce anemia. Hemoblogin's normal alpha and beta subunits each have an iron-containing central portion (heme) that allows the protein chain of a subunit to fold around it. Normal adult hemoglobin contains 2 alpha and 2 beta subunits. Thalassemias typically affect only the mRNAs for production of the beta chains (hence the name). Since the mutation may be a change in only a single base (single-nucleotide polymorphism), on-going efforts seek gene therapies to make that single correction.

Risk factors
Family history and ancestry are factors that increase the risk of beta thalassemia. Depending on family history, if a person's parents or grandparents had beta thalassemia major or intermedia, there is a 75% (3 out of 4) probability (see inheritance chart at top of page) of the mutated gene being inherited by an offspring. Even if a child does not have beta thalassemia major or intermedia, they can still be a carrier, possibly resulting in future generations of their offspring having beta thalassemia.

Another risk factor is ancestry. Beta thalassemia occurs most often in people of Italian, Greek, Middle Eastern, Southern Asian, and African ancestry.

Diagnosis 

Abdominal pain due to hypersplenism, splenic infarction and right-upper quadrant pain caused by gallstones are major clinical manifestations. However, diagnosing thalassemia from symptoms alone is inadequate. Physicians note these signs as associative due to this disease's complexity. The following associative signs can attest to the severity of the phenotype: pallor, poor growth, inadequate food intake, splenomegaly, jaundice, maxillary hyperplasia, dental malocclusion, cholelithiasis, systolic ejection murmur in the presence of severe anemia and pathologic fractures. Based on symptoms, tests are ordered for a differential diagnosis. These tests include complete blood count; hemoglobin electrophoresis; serum transferrin, ferritin, total iron-binding capacity; urine urobilin and urobilogen; peripheral blood smear, which may show codocytes, or target cells; hematocrit; and serum bilirubin. The expected pattern on hemoglobin electrophoresis in people with beta-thalassemia is an increased level of hemoglobin A2 and slightly increased hemoglobin F. The diagnosis is confirmed with hemoglobin electrophoresis or high performance liquid chromatography.

Skeletal changes associated with expansion of the bone marrow:
 Chipmunk facies: bossing of the skull, prominent malar eminence, depression of the bridge of the nose, tendency to a mongoloid slant of the eye, and exposure of the upper teeth due to hypertrophy of the maxillae.
 Hair-on-end (or "crew cut") on skull X-ray: new bone formation due to the inner table.

DNA analysis 

All beta thalassemias may exhibit abnormal red blood cells; a family history is followed by DNA analysis. This test is used to investigate deletions and mutations in the alpha- and beta-globin-producing genes. Family studies can be done to evaluate carrier status and the types of mutations present in other family members. DNA testing is not routine, but can help diagnose thalassemia and determine carrier status. In most cases the treating physician uses a clinical prediagnosis assessing anemia symptoms: fatigue, breathlessness and poor exercise tolerance. Further genetic analysis may include HPLC should routine electrophoresis prove difficult.

Prevention
Beta thalassemia is a hereditary disease allowing for a preventative treatment by carrier screening and prenatal diagnosis. It can be prevented if one parent has normal genes, giving rise to screenings that empower carriers to select partners with normal hemoglobin. A study aimed at detecting the genes that could give rise to offspring with sickle cell disease. Patients diagnosed with beta thalassemia have MCH ≤ 26 pg and an RDW < 19. Of 10,148 patients, 1,739 patients had a hemoglobin phenotype and RDW consistent with beta thalassemia. After the narrowing of patients, the HbA2 levels were tested presenting 77 patients with beta thalassemia. This screening procedure proved insensitive in populations of West African ancestry because of the indicators has high prevalence of alpha thalassemia. Countries have programs distributing information about the reproductive risks associated with carriers of haemoglobinopathies. Thalassemia carrier screening programs have educational programs in schools, armed forces, and through mass media as well as providing counseling to carriers and carrier couples. Screening has shown reduced incidence; by 1995 the prevalence in Italy reduced from 1:250 to 1:4000, and a 95% decrease in that region. The decrease in incidence has benefitted those affected with thalassemia, as the demand for blood has decreased, therefore improving the supply of treatment.

Treatment

Beta thalassemia major

Affected children require regular lifelong blood transfusions. Bone marrow transplants can be curative for some children. Patients receive frequent blood transfusions that lead to or potentiate iron overload. Iron chelation treatment is necessary to prevent damage to internal organs in cases of iron overload. Advances in iron chelation treatments allow patients with thalassemia major to live long lives with access to proper treatment. Popular chelators include deferoxamine and deferiprone.

The oral chelator deferasirox was approved for use in 2005 in some countries. Bone marrow transplantation is the only cure and is indicated for patients with severe thalassemia major. Transplantation can eliminate a patient's dependence on transfusions. Absent a matching donor, a savior sibling can be conceived by preimplantation genetic diagnosis (PGD) to be free of the disease as well as to match the recipient's human leukocyte antigen (HLA) type.

Serum ferritin (the storage form of iron) is routinely measured in those with beta thalassemia to determine the degree of iron overload; with increased ferritin levels directing the use of iron chelation therapy. The three iron chelators; subcutaneous deferoxamine, oral deferiprone and oral deferasirox can be used as monotherapy or in combination, they have all been shown to decrease serum/systemic iron levels, hepatic and cardiac iron levels as well as decreasing the risk of cardiac arrhythmia, heart failure and death. Hepatic and myocardial MRI is also used to quantify the iron deposition in target organs, especially the heart and liver, to guide therapy.

Scientists at Weill Cornell Medical College have developed a gene therapy strategy that could feasibly treat both beta-thalassemia and sickle cell disease. The technology is based on delivery of a lentiviral vector carrying both the human β-globin gene and an ankyrin insulator to improve gene transcription and translation, and boost levels of β-globin production.

On June 10, 2022, a U.S. federal advisory panel recommended that the FDA approve a gene therapy treatment for use with beta thalassemia. The manufacturer Bluebird bio charges $2.8 million in the United States for its one-time treatment Zynteglo (Betibeglogene autotemcel).

Surgical
Patients with thalassemia major are more inclined to have a splenectomy. The use of splenectomies have been declining in recent years due to decreased prevalence of hypersplenism in adequately transfused patients. Splenectomy is also associated with increased risk of infections and increased morbidity due to vascular disease, as the spleen is involved in scavenging to rid the body of pathologic or abnormal red blood cells. Patients with hypersplenism are more likely to have a lower amount of healthy blood cells in their body than normal and reveal symptoms of anemia. The different surgical techniques are the open and laparoscopic method. The laparoscopic method requires longer operating time but a shorter recovery period with a smaller and less prominent surgical scar. If it is unnecessary to remove the entire spleen a partial splenectomy may occur; this method preserves some of the immune function while reducing the probability of hypersplenism. Those undergoing splenectomy should receive an appropriate pneumococcal vaccine at least one week (preferably three weeks) before the surgery.

Therapeutic
Long-term transfusion therapy (in those with transfusion dependent beta thalassemia) is a treatment used to maintain hemoglobin levels at a target pre-transfusion hemoglobin level of 9–10.5 g/dL (11-12 g/dL in those with concomitant heart disease). To ensure quality blood transfusions, the packed red blood cells should be leucoreduced. By having leucoreduced blood packets, the patient is at a lower risk to develop adverse reactions by contaminated white cells and preventing platelet alloimmunisation. Patients with allergic transfusion reactions or unusual red cell antibodies must receive washed red cells or cryopreserved red cells. Washed red cells have been removed of plasma proteins that would have become a target of the patient's antibodies allowing the transfusion to be carried out safely. Cryopreserved red cells are used to maintain a supply of rare donor units for patients with unusual red cell antibodies or missing common red cell antigens. These regular transfusions promote normal growth, physical activities and suppress bone marrow hyperactivity.

Pharmaceutical
During normal iron homeostasis the circulating iron is bound to transferrin. But with iron overload (such as with frequent blood transfusions), the ability for transferrin to bind iron is exceeded and non-transferrin bound iron accumulated. This unbound iron is toxic due to its high propensity to induce oxygen species and is responsible for cellular damage. The prevention of iron overload protects patients from morbidity and mortality. The primary aim is to bind to and remove iron from the body and a rate equal to the rate of transfusional iron input or greater than iron input. Iron chelation is a medical therapy that may prevent the complications of iron overload. Every unit of transfused blood contains 200–250 mg of iron and the body has no natural mechanism to remove excess iron. The excess iron can be removed by iron chelators (deferoxamine, deferiprone and deferasirox).

Luspatercept (ACE-536) is a recombinant fusion protein that is used as a treatment in adults with transfusion dependent beta thalassemia. It consists of a modified extra-cellular domain of  human activin receptor type IIB bound to the Fc portion of the human IgG1 antibody. The molecule binds to select transforming growth factor beta superfamily ligands to block SMAD2 and 3 signaling, thus enhancing erythroid maturation. The medication has been shown to reduce the transfusion burden by 33% in adults with transfusion dependent beta thalassemia as compared to placebo and was also associated with decreased ferritin levels (with no significant decreases in liver or cardiac iron levels).

Beta thalassemia intermedia 
Patients with beta thalassemia intermedia require no transfusions or may require episodic blood transfusions during certain circumstances (infection, pregnancy, surgery). Patients with frequent transfusions may develop iron overload and require chelation therapy. Transmission is autosomal recessive; however, dominant mutations and compound heterozygotes have been reported. Genetic counseling is recommended and prenatal diagnosis may be offered.

Beta thalassemia minor 
Patients with beta thalassemia minor are usually asymptomatic and are often monitored without treatment. Beta thalassemia minor may coexist with other conditions such as chronic hepatitis B, chronic hepatitis C, non-alcoholic fatty liver disease and alcoholic liver disease that, when combined or co-existing, may cause a person to have iron overload of the liver and more severe liver disease.

Epidemiology 
The beta form of thalassemia is particularly prevalent among the Mediterranean peoples and this geographical association is responsible for its naming: thalassa (θάλασσα) is the Greek word for sea and haima (αἷμα) is the Greek word for blood. In Europe, the highest concentrations of the disease are found in Greece and the Turkish coastal regions. The major Mediterranean islands (except the Balearics) such as Sicily, Sardinia, Corsica, Cyprus, Malta and Crete are heavily affected in particular. Other Mediterranean peoples, as well as those in the vicinity of the Mediterranean, also have high incidence rates, including people from West Asia and North Africa. The data indicate that 15% of the Greek and Turkish Cypriots are carriers of beta-thalassaemia genes, while 10% of the population carry alpha-thalassaemia genes.

Evolutionary adaptation 
The thalassemia trait may confer a degree of protection against malaria, which is or was prevalent in the regions where the trait is common, thus conferring a selective survival advantage on carriers (known as heterozygous advantage), thus perpetuating the mutation. In that respect, the various thalassemias resemble another genetic disorder affecting hemoglobin, sickle-cell disease.

Incidence 
The disorder is more prevalent in certain ethnicities and age groups. Beta thalassemia is most prevalent in the "thalassemia belt" which includes areas in Sub-Saharan Africa, the Mediterranean extending into the Middle East and Southeast Asia. This geographical distribution is thought to be due to beta-thalassemia carrier state (beta thalassemia minor) conferring a resistance to malaria. In the United States, thalassemia's prevalence is approximately 1 in 272,000 or 1,000 people. There have been 4,000 hospitalized cases in England in 2002 and 9,233 consultant episodes for thalassemia. Men accounted for 53% of hospital consultant episodes and women accounted for 47%. The mean patient age is 23, with only 1% of consultants being older than 75, and 69% being 15–59. It is estimated that 1.5% of the world's population are carriers and 40,000 affected infants are born with the disease annually. Beta thalassemia major is usually fatal in infancy if blood transfusions are not initiated immediately.

See also
 Alpha-thalassemia
 Anisopoikilocytosis (variance in red blood cell size, usually as a result of beta thalassemia)
 Delta-thalassemia
 Hemoglobinopathy

References

Further reading

External links 

Disorders of globin and globulin proteins
Hereditary hemolytic anemias
Rare diseases